Small nucleolar RNA, C/D box 24 is a protein that in humans is encoded by the SNORD24 gene, on chromosome 9.

References